Bladen Wilmer Hawke, 9th Baron Hawke (31 December 1901 – 5 July 1985), was a British Conservative politician. He was the eldest son of Edward Julian Hawke, 8th Baron Hawke, whom he succeeded as 9th Baron Hawke in 1939. His uncle had been Martin Hawke, 7th Baron Hawke, who died in 1938. Hawke's mother was Lady Frances Alice Hawke, daughter of Colonel John Randal Wilmer.

Having succeeded in the barony, he served as a Lord-in-waiting (government whip in the House of Lords) from 1953 to 1957 in the Conservative administrations of Sir Winston Churchill, Sir Anthony Eden and Harold Macmillan. From 1958 to 1974 he was a Church Commissioner.

Family
Hawke married Ina Mary Faure Walker, daughter of Henry Faure Walker, in 1934. They had seven daughters.

Death
He died in July 1985, aged 83. As he had no sons he was succeeded in the barony by his younger brother, Julian.

Notes

References
Kidd, Charles, Williamson, David (editors). Debrett's Peerage and Baronetage (1990 edition). New York: St Martin's Press, 1990, 

Prunella Servatius (née Hawke)

1901 births
1985 deaths
Baronesses- and Lords-in-Waiting
9
Ministers in the third Churchill government, 1951–1955
Ministers in the Eden government, 1955–1957
Ministers in the Macmillan and Douglas-Home governments, 1957–1964